Alfons Peeters (21 January 1943 – 5 January 2015) was a Belgian footballer. During his career he played for R.S.C. Anderlecht. He earned 4 caps for the Belgium national football team, and participated in the 1970 FIFA World Cup.

Honours

Player 
RSC Anderlecht

 Inter-Cities Fairs Cup runners-up: 1969–70

References

Royal Belgian Football Association: Number of caps

External links
 

1943 births
2015 deaths
Belgian footballers
Belgium international footballers
1970 FIFA World Cup players
R.S.C. Anderlecht players
Belgian Pro League players
People from Beringen, Belgium
Association football midfielders
K.A.A. Gent players
R. Olympic Charleroi Châtelet Farciennes players
K. Beringen F.C. players
Footballers from Limburg (Belgium)